Autoroute du Soleil may refer to:

A6 autoroute (France)
A7 autoroute (France)